The following is a list of comets discovered, co-discovered and re-discovered by the Lincoln Laboratory Near-Earth Asteroid Research project (LINEAR), an Earth-based automated sky survey.

In comet nomenclature, the letter before the "/" is either "C" (a non-periodic comet), "P" (a periodic comet), "D" (a comet which has been lost or has disintegrated), "X" (a comet for which no reliable orbit could be calculated — usually historical comets), or "A" for an object that was mistakenly identified as a comet, but is a minor planet.

Numbered periodic comets

Unnumbered periodic comets

Non-periodic comets

See also 
 List of periodic comets
 List of non-periodic comets
 Minor Planet Center

Footnotes

External links 
 Minor Planet Center Periodic Comet Numbers
 Cometography.com Periodic Comets
 Seiichi Yoshida's Comet Catalog (includes a listing of unnumbered periodic comets)
 Periodic comets on the Planetary Data System Small Bodies Node

LINEAR